Araz Taqan (also Romanized as Arāz Taqān and Ārāz Taqān) is a village in Nezamabad Rural District, in the Central District of Azadshahr County, Golestan Province, Iran. At the 2006 census, its population was 484, in 96 families.

References 

Populated places in Azadshahr County